The English rock group the Rolling Stones have released 30 studio albums, 13 live albums, 29 compilation albums, three extended plays, 121 singles, 33 box sets, 50 video albums and 77 music videos. Throughout their career, they have sold over 240 million records worldwide. Billboard ranked them as the 2nd Greatest artist of all time (behind the Beatles). The Rolling Stones have scored 37 top-10 albums (9 No. 1 albums) on the Billboard 200 and 8 No. 1 hits on the Billboard Hot 100. According to the Recording Industry Association of America, they have sold 66.5 million albums in the US, making them the 16th best-selling group in history.

The early singles and albums released from 1963 to 1967 were originally on Decca Records in the United Kingdom, and on their subsidiary label London Records in the United States.

Prior to 1967, it was common practice for British releases to be reconfigured for the American market. In some cases, the US version would be an entirely different album with different tracks, cover photos and liner notes. The first five British Rolling Stones albums were converted into seven LPs for the American market, adding material from singles and the UK EPs. The two Big Hits singles packages, from 1966 and 1969 respectively, differ in each nation, and in the case of December's Children (And Everybody's) and Flowers there are no UK counterparts. Studio releases from Their Satanic Majesties Request in 1967 forward are uniform in both the UK and the US.

Albums

Studio albums

Live albums

Compilation albums

Official bootlegs

Other albums

Box sets

Albums, singles and video collections

Special edition albums and reissue box sets

Extended plays

Singles

In some cases the single's B-side charted separately.
Second single in the US is "Not Fade Away" b/w "I Wanna Be Your Man" (London 45-LON 9657), released on March 6, 1964, respectively the A-sides of the group's third and second singles in the UK. The group's first single in the US was "I Wanna Be Your Man" b/w Stoned (London 45-LON 9641), released in February 1964.
On 9 and 16 July 1963, the band recorded "Poison Ivy" and "Fortune Teller" to be their second single. A few hundred copies were pressed, but the single was withdrawn. These recordings would be included on the album Saturday Club, a compilation of tracks from various artists appearing on the Saturday Club (BBC radio) show of the time.

1963–1979

1980–1993

1994–2006

2007–present

Billboard Year-End performances

Other charted songs

Videography

Video albums

Music videos

See also
Live'r Than You'll Ever Be
Keith Richards discography

References

External links
The Complete Works of the Rolling Stones 1962–2011

The worldwide singles & EPs discography of the Rolling Stones (subscription required)

Discography
Discographies of British artists
Rock music group discographies